Warhammer Age of Sigmar is a miniature wargame produced by Games Workshop that simulates battles between armies by using miniature figurines. Games are typically played on a relatively flat surface such as a dining table, bespoke gaming table, or an area of floor. The playing area is often decorated with models and materials representing buildings and terrain. Players take turns taking a range of actions with their models: moving, charging, shooting ranged weapons, fighting, and casting magical spells; the outcomes of which are generally determined by dice rolls. Besides the game itself, a large part of Age of Sigmar is dedicated to the hobby of collecting, assembling and painting the miniature figurines from the game. 

Whereas some wargames recreate historical warfare, Age of Sigmar has a fantasy theme heavily inspired by the fiction of J. R. R. Tolkien and Michael Moorcock. Player's armies fight with medieval-era weaponry and cast magical spells, and the warriors are a mixture of humans and fantasy creatures such as elves, dwarves, and orks.

Age of Sigmar is the sequel to the discontinued game Warhammer (specifically Warhammer Fantasy Battle). Due to this, the game contains many of the same characters, themes, and models as its predecessor. A key difference in the rules is the move away from rigid rectangular formations to looser units.

Editions 
The first edition of Age of Sigmar in 2015 replaced Warhammer Fantasy Battle. Another set released for the first edition was Spire of Dawn, which reused the High Elf and Skaven models from the Isle of Blood (Warhammer 8th edition starter set). The initial release of AoS did not include point values for individual units—these were added later—and instead imbalance was to be mitigated by number of models. If one side started the game with one-third more models than the other, the smaller side could choose a "sudden death" win condition for itself. Summoning new units used the same mechanics as spellcasting and required the dedication of reinforcement points for each summonable unit.

The initial release is notable for having included many absurd rules such as:Pride of the Reiksguard: Helborg’s skill is as legendary as his moustache is magnificent. You can re-roll any failed hit rolls when attacking with the Runefang so long as you have a bigger and more impressive moustache than your opponent.Escapist Magazine noted that such ridiculous rules could easily be exploited since nothing in the rules said the moustache had to be real and suggested players buy novelty moustaches to satisfy the condition. Other such rules included re-rolls for players pretending to ride and talk to an imaginary horse, screaming a guttural warcry, and keeping a straight face when their opponent tries to make them laugh. Some contemporary reviews were highly critical of such rules saying that while they may have been intended as jokes to encourage roleplaying, they opened up players to ridicule.

The second edition of AoS was released in 2018 following the Malign Portents event. It brought multiple significant changes to the rules, notably an overhaul of the summoning system, the elimination of reinforcement points, and the introduction of endless spells.

The third edition of AoS was released in June 2021, following the Broken Realms campaign series - in which the status quo of the setting was drastically altered. The new edition featured an overhaul of the Battalion system, objectives, and the introduction of a new Path to Glory narrative campaign.

Setting 

Age of Sigmar is set in the Mortal Realms, a system of eight interconnected realms spawned from the Winds of Magic. The second edition brought with it rules for each of the realms, adding spells, artefacts, and realm characteristics.

Azyr, the Realm of the Heavens: A swirling array of comets, asteroids, planetoids and landmasses - some of which are dotted with great cities, such as Azyrheim - Sigmar's capital. The realm is ruled over by Sigmar, and as a consequence of him shutting its gates at the onset of the Age of Chaos, is the only one fully untouched by Chaos. Azyr is the home of the Stormcast Eternals and the Temple-Ships of the Seraphon, as well as a diverse population of humans, aelves, duardin, and other races.
Aqshy, the Realm of Fire: A harsh, arid land generally dominated by volcanoes, deserts, and lava fields. It is the ancestral home of the Fyreslayers, as it is where their God Grimnir perished. The Realm had a significant Khornate presence before the arrival of the Stormcast Eternals, with the first battle of the Realmgate Wars happening in Aqshy. Since then, it had become more widely occupied by Order-aligned forces, playing host to many of the biggest Cities of Sigmar - Hammerhal Aqsha, Anvilgard, Hallowheart, and Tempest's Eye being notable examples.
Ghur, the Realm of Beasts: A realm of untamed savagery, Ghur is a land of titanic beasts wherein everything - the trees, mountains, and even the continents themselves - is alive and apart of a food chain. The savage nature of the realms makes it the de facto kingdom of Gorkamorka, with the forces of Destruction mainly occupying the realm. Some civilisation does exist, however - the Free City of Excelsis and the Ivory Legion of Ossiarch Bonereapers being the foremost.
Ghyran, the Realm of Life: Ghyran is distinguished by its extreme fecundity, being filled with the most verdant kinds of life - lush forests, glittering mountains, and pure streams being commonplace. It is claimed by Alarielle, goddess of the Sylvaneth, and plays host to a sizeable population of humans as well. The realm was the focus of Nurgle's attentions, being almost entirely subsumed by the Plague God before the resurgence of Alarielle.
Chamon, the Realm of Metal: A realm composed of metal-based continents in constant flux with each other. It was originally colonised by the Duardin god Grungni, who left for Azyr upon being satisfied with his work. Due to the Realm's mercurial and ever-changing nature, it is coveted particularly by Tzeentch. It is the birthplace of the Kharadron Overlords, the first of which came from the holds in Chamon during the Age of Chaos. Each Realmgate in Chamon was destroyed by Be'lakor in the events of the Broken Realms series, with a storm of chaotic energy forming over the realm.
Shyish, the Realm of Death: Shyish is every underworld and afterlife in the Realms, with the most ancient and forgotten of them being drawn into the centre of the Realm by a pool of death magic known as the Shyish Nadir. It is the nigh-uncontested domain of Nagash, who made sure to kill and absorb the essence of every other death god in the realms. Vampires, ghouls, undead, nighthaunt, and ossiarchs all are found in their greatest number here, although mortals do exist within it, such as the Cities of Lethis and Ulfenkarn. 
Hysh, the Realm of Light: The domain of the twin aelf gods Tyrion and Teclis. Hysh is a realm of enlightenment and knowledge, split into ten Nations - eight of which are dominated by the Lumineth Realm-lords, with one being controlled by non-aelfs and one totally uninhabitable. The Realm was greatly damaged by these Aelves' hubris in an event known as the Spirefall during the Age of Chaos. It serves as the "sun" of the Realms.
Ulgu, the Realm of Shadow: A land of shifting illusions and impenetrable fog claimed by Malerion and his mother Morathi. Little is known of Ulgu other than that it is the home of the Daughters of Khaine faction and the City of Misthåvn.
The Eightpoints: Known as the Allpoints in the Age of Myth, it is a sub-realm that lies at the centre of the Realms, serving as a way to connect and move between them all. When the Age of Chaos came, they were seized by Archaon the Everchosen and renamed the Eightpoints in honour of the Chaos Gods. 
The Realm of Chaos: A pseudo-realms that permeates the void between the Realms. It is home to the Gods of Chaos. Of the original four Chaos Gods, Slaanesh is currently missing, imprisoned between the realms of Hysh and Ulgu. The Horned Rat has ascended to the pantheon of Chaos and is now the Great Horned Rat.

Gameplay 
Age of Sigmar emphasises the narrative aspect of the wargaming experience, encouraging the play of story-driven scenarios, recreation of battles from lore, and player-created stories. The ruleset is designed to make the game easy to learn but hard to master. Basic rules of play are simple and quick to understand, but more advanced mechanics can be found in unit-specific "Warscrolls" that detail more rules and stats of the individual unit. The art of the game lies in understanding how your units work together and exploiting synergies to use them as a cohesive army. The rules and Warscrolls are free, and can be downloaded from the Games Workshop website or viewed in the Age of Sigmar app.

Age of Sigmar has three different modes of play. Of these, Matched Play includes points total for different units and specific points limits for army building (1,000, 2,000, and 2,500 points). In this mode of play, there are Army Composition rules that change depending on the point level being played, and the base rules are modified to allow for balanced play. A Matched Play game also requires a minimum number of Battleline rank-and-file units, and imposes a limit on the number of Heroes and Behemoths that can be fielded.

In addition to Matched Play, Open Play represents an "anything goes" game style, while Narrative Play focuses on recreating historical battles and scenarios. The latter often adds additional rules specific to the setting or event, such as dangerous terrain, a meteor shower, or movement restrictions.

To play any of the game modes, two or more players assemble armies beforehand. The battlefield and its terrain is set up on an appropriate surface, and dice are rolled to determine turn order. The players play in turns, with a round consisting of one turn per player. Combat is resolved through a series of dice rolls: a hit roll and wound roll from the attacker, and a save roll from the defender. If both the hit and wound rolls pass and the save roll fails, then damage is allocated. Mortal Wounds do not require dice rolls and are allocated directly.

The first part of a player's turn, the Hero Phase, is when spells are cast and command abilities are activated. Wizard units can usually cast one of three spells: the offensive Arcane Bolt, the defensive Mystic Shield, and a third spell unique to that unit. Command abilities, on the other hand, require a Hero on the battlefield with that ability, and use Command Points for activation. The second phase is the Movement Phase, in which units are moved across the battlefield; the player may choose to make them run, which makes them incapable of shooting or charging in the following phases. The Shooting Phase resolves all the missile attacks possible for the current player, then the Charge Phase gets melee units within range of attacking. The Combat Phase starts with units piling in, then attacking with all their melee weapons. The player whose turn it is attacks first, then the defending player fights with another unit; the players continue taking turns until all units capable of attacking have done so. The final Battleshock Phase tests the morale of depleted units; failed Battleshock rolls cause further models to flee a unit.

Factions 
Each faction in Age of Sigmar is apart of one of four super-factions, called Grand Alliances. In the lore, factions within a Grand Alliance are generally united by common goals and aims. Conflict still occurs within Grand Alliances, however, as each faction will often have its own agenda that clashes with the agenda of other factions.

In early periods of Age of Sigmar - specifically First Edition - armies could be built from multiple factions within the same Alliance (e.g. Stormcast Eternals, Seraphon, and Sylvaneth), with an allegiance corresponding to that particular Grand Alliance but not to any of the individual factions. In more recent editions, armies are built mostly from individual factions (e.g. a Stormcast Eternals army) with an option to include a limited number of allies from related factions within the alliance (e.g. a Stormcast Eternals army with 200 points of Seraphon allies). An army consisting of Factions usually synergise best with their own units, and faction-specific armies receive bonuses and additional rules that are not available to mixed Grand Alliance armies.

Order 
Order is primarily opposed to Chaos, and its factions are united by a common desire to maintain civilization, art, and learning, or preserve natural or divine holdings. Despite this shared goal, each faction more or less pursues its own agenda - sometimes to the detriment of the others.
 Stormcast Eternals: Heavily armoured magical warriors imbued with a portion of Sigmar's power, designed to be the ultimate weapon against the forces of Chaos.

Each Stormcast was once a mortal that, upon death, had their soul taken to Azyr and subjected a series of trials in a process known as "reforging", granting them great power. This comes with effective immortality, as when they are killed, Stormcast souls are instead sent back to Azyr to be reforged again. This comes at a price, however - upon each reforging, the Stormcast loses a certain aspects of their personality, ranging from memories of their mortal life, certain emotions, or even changing physically.

Sigmar's unleashing of the Stormcast is upon the realms was the first official lore of the setting, with the first Starter Set being an army of Stormcast Eternals against an army of Khorne Bloodbound. Due to their large armour and prominence in marketing of the game, the Stormcast Eternals are considered roughly analogous to the Space Marines of Warhammer 40,000.

In the Broken Realms event, the Daemon Prince Be'lakor unleashed a Storm of Chaos upon the Realms (specifically the Realm of Metal) which prevented the Stormcast from returning to Azyr to be reforged. In reaction to this, a new type of armour known as Thunderstrike Armour was created. The armour causes the Stormcast to unleash an explosion of lightning upon death, breaking through the chaotic storm.

 Cities of Sigmar: Also known as the Free Cities, the Cities of Sigmar are strongholds and city-states established by the forces of Order, representing the average citizenry of the Mortal Realms. They can be found in every realm, with the highest concentration of them being in Aqshy and Ghyran - the first five founded in the latter being known as the Seeds of Hope. They are built on or around Realmgates, or other such strategically vital points. Each City typically has a fortress of Stormcast Eternals known as a Stormkeep within it, who generally keep a watchful eye over the population of the settlement.

The majority of the remaining dwarf, elf, and human units from Warhammer Fantasy that continue to be usable in Age of Sigmar are featured in this army. While they are all the same army, each unit has a species keyword and each species is divided into several subfactions, with leaders' spells and abilities synergising with particular keywords, allowing for the armies to be played as diverse or similarly to how they played in Warhammer Fantasy. Stormcast Eternals are also able to be taken by all cities without regard to normal point limits on allies but may only make up 1/4 of the units in the army while the Living City is able to do the same with Sylvaneth and Tempest's Eye with the Kharadron Overlords.
 Collegiate Arcane: Colleges and academic institutions of human wizards dedicated to the study and use of magic.
 Darkling Covens: Aelven covens and cults originating mostly from Ulgu, each dominated by an individual Sorceress. They are known to practice unsavoury magics based around mind-control, kept secret from the other forces of Order.
 Devoted of Sigmar: The organised church of Sigmar, composed of priests, rabid flagellants, and Witch Hunters. Their main task is to purify corrupted land and purge unfaithful or treacherous elements. 
 Dispossessed: The remnants of the shattered Khazalid Duardin empires that emigrated to Azyr with the coming of the Age of Chaos. The Dispossessed are known for their prowess in blacksmithing and masonry, being the primary architects and builders of fortifications in the cities.
 Freeguild: Regiments of mostly Human soldiers that generally make up the bulk of a City's standing army.
 Ironweld Arsenal An alliance of engineering schools composed of both human and duardin, responsible for technological innovation and the creation of War Machines.
 Order Serpentis: Cruel knights that claim descent from the Aelven empire of Nakarth in Ulgu. They are known for breeding various draconic beasts for war.
 Phoenix Temple: An Aelven cult that worships a Godbeast called the Ur-Phoenix.
 Scourge Privateers: Raiders and pirates that sail the seas of the realms searching for plunder and prey, sometimes hiring themselves out to the Cities for a price.
 Wanderers: A Druidic religious order of Aelves that once lived in Ghyran, serving Alarielle. After their perceived betrayal in the Age of Chaos, they were banned from re-entering the realm, and thus they guard nature elsewhere.
 Seraphon: The Seraphon are lizard-people led by the Slann, a caste of frog-like mage-priests. They exist to follow a nebulous "Great Plan" known only to the Slann, serving as arbiters to the realms and warriors against Chaos.

They are split into two groups - the Starborne and the Coalesced. The Starborne reside in the race's colossal temple-ships in the Realm of Azyr, with all non-Slann being in a state of stasis until they are beamed down into the realms at the Slann's discretion. They are generally more aloof and alien, being beamed back to Azyr once their purpose in the Realms is served. The Coalesced are Seraphon that have chosen to remain within the Realms, slowly adapting to the environment. These Seraphon are often more bestial and savage.

 Sylvaneth: The Sylvaneth are a race of forest spirits mostly resembling Dryads or Ents. They are considered to be the children of Alarielle, the Goddess of Life. She created them to guard the forests and woodlands of the realms, and are telepathically connected to her via a collective telepathic network referred to as the "spirit-song". The Sylvaneth were a kind and peaceful race until the coming of the Age of Chaos, which decimated them. As such, they were forced to become cruel and defensive, with many Sylvaneth tribes murdering any who attempted to enter their forests.

In the Broken Realms event, Alarielle performed a ritual which reversed the damage done to the Realm of Life by the forces of Chaos - specifically Nurgle - which simultaneously empowered the Sylvaneth and caused a ripple of life magic to travel across the Realms, which indirectly awoke Kragnos.

 Fyreslayers: Duardin who worship Grimnir, the deceased god of war. Grimnir was slain in the Age of Myth in a duel with the godbeast Vulcatrix. He supposedly exploded into a material called Ur-Gold, which the Fyreslayers will go to any length to obtain - a common tactic being hiring themselves as mercenaries. They seek the Ur-Gold both to empower themselves by hammering them in the form of runes into their bodies, and so that - by releasing Grimnir's energy back into the realms - they can resurrect their god eventually. Fyreslayers have strong family bonds, gathering in patriarchal Lodges headed by a single Runefather.

Their design is based on the Slayers from the Dwarfs army in Fantasy Battle.

 Kharadron Overlords: A steampunk duardin faction that consists of ironclad airships and warriors wearing armoured suits. Separated a long time ago from the rest of their race, the Kharadron live in sky-cities and are armed with shooting weapons powered by the gaseous aether-gold, the resource which their entire civilisation is centralised upon. The Sky-ports are each bound by the "Kharadron Code", a constitution of which each port has its own divergences and sub-articles.
 Daughters of Khaine: The Daughters of Khaine are a shadowy cabal of witch aelves devoted to the Aelven God of Murder, Khaine and headed by his Grand Prophet, Morathi; ostensibly they wish to revive Khaine, however Morathi is merely using this energy to fuel her own ascension to godhood, which she went on to achieve.
 Idoneth Deepkin: Marine aelves created by Teclis with the intention of being the successors of the Asur. However, due to their souls being deeply scarred and wrong from their time in Slaanesh, they were rejected by Teclis and driven to hide in the sea. Their society is divided into three castes: the soulless Namarti, the magically inclined Isharann, and the militaristic Akhelians. They raid coastal settlements riding sea monsters in search of souls, which they use to extend the Namarti's considerably shorter lifespans. Although they primarily hunt Chaos forces, the Idoneth are known to raid races of the  Order faction as well.
 Lumineth Realm-lords: Teclis' successful attempt at recreating the Asur, the Lumineth are a race of Aelves that inhabit Hysh, the Realm of Light. After plunging Hysh into a period of strife at the onset of the Age of Chaos, they became an ascetic society, bringing their predisposition for arrogance into check by binding themselves to the elemental spirits of the realm.

Chaos 
Fueled by the base desires and actions of mortals, Chaos factions seek to dominate the Mortal Realms. They serve the Chaos Gods, eldritch and warping deities predating the realms that reside in the Realm of Chaos. During the Age of Chaos, they had conquered almost all of the eight Mortal Realms (aside from Azyr), only being stopped by Sigmar's resurgence. The forces of Chaos are lead overall by Archaon, Lord of the End Times, the greatest champion of all four gods.

 Slaves to Darkness: Mortals devoted to Chaos in its undivided form. Their Warbands can be the most diverse amongst the Grand Alliance, ranging from desperate tribespeople with nowhere else to turn to power-hungry marauders and fanatics seeking to maim and kill.

Archaon's personal champions - known as the Varanguard - exist within the Slaves to Darkness, with each member of the order being a powerful chaos champion in their own right.

 Blades of Khorne: The servants of the Chaos God of War, Slaughter, and Blood, Khorne. Their deity is the most martial of the Chaos Pantheon, demanding that his servants commit as much wanton violence and murder as possible - with common chants amongst them being "Blood for the Blood God" and "Skulls for the Skull Throne". Khornate mortals (known as Bloodbound) are most often barbarians or warriors, whereas Khornate daemons resemble classical Devils.

At the start of the Age of Sigmar, they controlled a vast majority of Aqshy, and were the first to encounter and battle the Stormcast Eternals.

 Disciples of Tzeentch: Followers of the Chaos God of Magic, Change, and Mutation, Tzeentch. Tzeentch resides in a crystal labyrinth within the Realm of Chaos, supposedly planning and manipulating fate itself. As such, followers of Tzeentch are Machiavellian to the extreme, often creating excessively convoluted plans and deceptions. Tzeentchian mortals (known as Arcanites) are generally wizards or scholars, specialising in infiltrating the Cities of Sigmar before leading mass cult uprisings. Tzeentchian daemons are usually gibbering, brightly coloured and amorphous monsters.

Their major stronghold was Chamon, where Ghal Maraz had been hidden, until the hammer was retrieved by the Stormcast Eternals.

 Maggotkin of Nurgle: The servants of the god of Plague, Entropy, and Disease, Nurgle. As a god of plague, Nurgle is a horrifically bloated and rotted entity that resides within mansion at the centre of a twisted "garden", where he creates every disease in existence. Nurglite mortals (known as Rotbringers) generally revere Nurgle out of hunger power of desperation, often turning to him to avoid starvation or death from plague. Nurglite daemons are decayed, shambling creatures that maintain the Garden in Nurgle's stead.

Nurgle's realm of choice was the fertile realm of Ghyran, wherein he sought to capture Alarielle for his own. The realm was nearly overwhelmed by the Rotbringers, before the intervention of the forces of Order pushing them back.

 Hedonites of Slaanesh:: The servants of the god of Pleasure and Excess, Slaanesh. Upon consuming the souls of every elf in the World-That-Was, Slaanesh was weakened, being captured by the Aelven gods and imprisoned in the sub-realm of Ul-Ghysh, between Hysh and Ulgu. The mortal followers of Slaanesh (known as Sybarites) are usually excessive pleasure-seekers, such as corrupt nobles or aristocrats. The Slaaneshi daemons often resemble Succubi.

Due to their God’s imprisonment, the followers of Slaanesh have split into 3 groups - the Godseeksers, who wish to find and free their god, the Invaders, that are content to raid and pillage freely, and the Pretenders, who actively seek to usurp Slaanesh’s position as the god of Excess.

 Beasts of Chaos: The forces of the Beastmen, Monsters of Chaos, Chaos Gargants, and Thunderscorn. Like the Slaves to Darkness they are not devoted to any specific chaos god, and many worship chaos in itself.
 The Legion of Azgorh: (Chaos Dwarfs) and Tamurkhan's Horde (Nurgle) are Forgeworld-only, and have their own rules. Speculation on the return of Chaos Dwarfs to Age of Sigmar proper began in 2020 after the sourcebook Wrath of the Everchosen referred to Chaos-worshipping ‘corrupted duardin kingdoms.’
 The Skaven are now formally part of the realm of Chaos as the Great Horned Rat ascended to the pantheon of the Chaos Gods. These vile ratmen are subdivided into clans with different approaches to warfare. The Masterclan unites and manipulates the leaders of the Skaven armies. The Clans Skryre dabble in bizarre sorcery and science, creating horrific war machines in the process. The Clans Moulder breed grotesque war beasts. The Clans Pestilens are fanatically devoted to the Great Horned Rat's plague aspect, and they seek to spread pestilence across the realms. The Clans Eshin train stealthy assassins, and the Clans Verminus are Skaven warriors. The Skaven are arrogant, treacherous and cowardly, often backstabbing their superiors in order to gain a more favourable position in the ranks.

Death 
Opposed to Chaos and more or less allied with Order when against Chaos, Death wishes to rule all the realms for themselves. The most homogeneous of the Grand Alliances, it is ruled almost entirely by Nagash, the self-proclaimed God of Death.

 Soulblight Gravelords: A Gothic Horror inspired faction of Vampires, primarily based on the Vampire Counts from Fantasy Battle. They are primarily led by the two vampiric Mortarchs - Mannfred von Carstein and Neferata - and were created to spread Nagash's influence across the realms. They are split into individual Dynasties, each of which originates from the two Mortarchs.
 Deathmages: Necromancers that are commonly employed by Vampires to maintain the ranks of zombies and skeletons.
 Deathrattle: Barrow kingdoms led by Wight Kings and populated with skeletons. They lend military aid to Soulblight Vampires out of both mutual defence and respect.
 Deadwalkers: Mindless Zombies that are created either by Death magic or risen by Necromancers or Vampires. 
 Soulblight: Vampires, being those afflicted by what is known as the "Soulblight Curse". They are some of the most intelligent and independent of Nagash's servants, only paying lip service to the Great Necromancer.
 Flesh-Eater Courts: Insane cannibalistic ghouls descended from a Soulblight bloodline, that perceive themselves as shining and honourable aristocrats. This is due to a curse placed by Nagash upon their founder Ushoran, who escaped into the realms and infected others with it. Each court is led by an Abhorrant, who is seen as a noble king by ghouls.
 Nighthaunt: Ghosts that were unleashed upon the realms at the onset of the Necroquake. Most Nighthaunt are souls given a cruel or ironic punishment for their actions in life - for example, healers become scythe-handed harridans, and prisoners who died in prison are bound with chains forever. They are led by Lady Olynder, the Mortarch of Grief, and came to the fore as the rivalry between Sigmar and Nagash developed in the Second Edition of the game.
 Ossiarch Bonereapers: Bone constructs imbued with gestalt spirits. They are Nagash's intended vision for the realms, with their sole purpose being to serve as his vanguard and elite troops, and to collect and assimilate all life in the realms into their own ranks, creating a society known as the Necrotopia. They are led by Orpheon Katakros, the Mortarch of the Necropolis.

Destruction 
Unpredictable and opportunistic, Destruction factions are unified by their love of a good fight, their own self interest, or just pure survival. The patron god of each faction of the Grand Alliance is Gorkamorka - traditionally the god of the Greenskins - who is worshipped in different guises by each faction.

 Orruk Warclans: The Orruk Warclans are large, muscular greenskins that gather in hordes known as Waagh!s to do battle for the fun of it. They are inspired by both the Orcs and Goblins army from Warhammer Fantasy Battle and the Orks from Warhammer 40,000.
 Bonesplitterz: Savage, tribal, bone-wielding orruks that are seen as insane even by other Orruks. Bonesplitterz are created when an Orruk has a mind-breaking religious experience with Gorkamorka, which causes them to go cover themselves in war paint and run away into the wild. They specialise in hunting and slaying the beasts of the realms, as they believe that if they kill the monsters, then its strength will pass into them.
 Ironjawz: Ironjawz are the heavily armoured elite of the Orruks, being the biggest and toughest Orruks in any given tribe. Each Ironjaw is an Orruk that has personally crafted a suit of armour by punching a plate of scrap metal into shape with their bare hands. The most famous Ironjaw is Gordrakk, known by many as the Fist of Gork. He gathered an enormous Waagh! with a battering ram carved from the bones of a Godbeast to batter down the gates of Azyr.
Kruleboyz: The Kruleboyz are cunning swamp dwellers, using stealth and poison in place of brute strength. They are more gangly and thin than other Orruks, favouring worship of Mork over that of Gork. Their goal is to manipulate the god Kragnos into leading a never-ending Waagh! through the realms, by poisoning his homeland and sending him into a rage.
 Gloomspite Gitz: A diverse faction of Goblins (known as Grots in Age of Sigmar) united by their love of dark places and worship of the portentous Bad Moon.
 Moonclan: Troglodytic cave-dwelling Grots that make heavy use of fungus and breed numerous different types of Squig.
 Spiderfang Grots: Grots that traditionally dwell in either forests or caves, worshipping a "Spider-God" and their arachnid mounts.
 Troggoths: Brutish and durable Trolls that are manipulated by the Grots into fighting for them.
 Aleguzzler Gargants: Drunken Giants that are coerced into fighting for the Gitz by promise of alcohol or gold.
 Ogor Mawtribes: Giant, fat Ogres, renowned for their constant and all-consuming hunger. They were formerly the Ogre Kingdoms. Aside from the two main factions, it includes the fire-breathing Firebellies and the mercenary Maneaters. 
 Beastclaw Raiders: Tribes of ogors who ride on massive warbeasts. Eternally pursued by the supernatural Everwinter, they are constantly on the move, and anything they do not eat or destroy is frozen in their wake.
Gutbusters: Ogors most similar to the former Ogre Kingdoms.
 Sons of Behemat: A faction of Gargants (giants) descended from the godbeast Behemat. They sometimes hire themselves to other factions as mercenaries, being paid with things such as gold, food, and alcohol.

Boxed Sets

Starter Sets 
Warhammer: Age of Sigmar Starter Set: An army of the Stormcast Eternals Warrior Chamber against the Khorne Bloodbound.
Soul Wars: The Stormcast Eternals of the Sacrosanct Chamber against the Nighthaunt.
Dominions: The Thunderstrike Stormcast Eternals against the Kruleboyz Orruks.

Stand-Alone Battleboxes 
Blightwar: features the Maggotkin of Nurgle against the Stormcast Eternals
Wrath and Rapture: features the Blades of Khorne against the Hedonites of Slaanesh
Carrion Empire: features the Flesh-Eater Courts against the Skaven
Looncurse: features the Gloomspite Gitz against the Sylvaneth
Feast of Bones: features the Ogor Mawtribes against the Ossiarch Bonereapers
Aether War: features the Disciples of Tzeentch against the Kharadron Overlords
Shadow and Pain: features the Daughters of Khaine against the Hedonites of Slaanesh
Echoes of Doom: features the Skaven against the Sylvaneth 
Arcane Cataclysm : features the Disciples of Tzeentch against the Lumineth Realm-Lords

Reception

Criticism
Warhammer Age of Sigmar was widely criticised by the fanbase upon release for replacing the setting and gameplay of its predecessor, Warhammer Fantasy Battle. With the advent of the game's Second Edition, reception towards the game has improved, with it being cited by PC Gamer as being "close to its former glory".

Accolades
Realm War was nominated for "Best Mobile Game" at the Develop:Star Awards, and for "Best Strategy Game" at The Independent Game Developers' Association Awards, while Champions was nominated for "Best Social Game".

Notes

References

External links 
 Games Workshops free rules and Warscrolls for legacy armies

Games Workshop games
Miniature wargames
Fantasy games
Fantasy campaign settings
Horror fiction
Dark fantasy
Wargames introduced in the 2010s